Vadim Aleksandrovich Sayutin (born 31 December 1970) is a former speed skater who represented the Soviet Union, the Commonwealth of Independent States, Kazakhstan, and Russia, in that order. Sayutin was born in Alma-Ata (now Almaty), Kazakhstan, the city where the famous Medeo skating rink is located.

Sayutin performed best on the 5,000 m and the 10,000 m, which often kept him from winning medals during allround championships. However, he also managed to perform well on the 1,500 m a few times, resulting in a bronze medal at the 1998 European Allround Championships and a silver medal at the 1999 World Allround Championships. He participated in four Winter Olympic Games, but never won any medals there.

Sayutin started his speed skating career not long before the dissolution of the Soviet Union and so originally represented the Soviet Union. At the 1992 Winter Olympics of Albertville, he represented the Commonwealth of Independent States. After that, he represented Kazakhstan for two seasons. When he married Russian speed skater Svetlana Bazhanova in 1994, he started skating for Russia. During that time, he lived in the Netherlands for several years, training at the Thialf arena in Heerenveen.

After the 2002/2003 season, Sayutin ended his speed skating career.

Medals
An overview of medals won by Sayutin at important championships he participated in, listing the years in which he won each. He participated at least once in all the championships that are listed.

Personal records
To put these personal records in perspective, the WR column lists the official world records on the dates that Sayutin skated his personal records.

Note that Sayutin's personal record on the big combination was not a world record because Rintje Ritsma skated 152.651 at the same meet.

Sayutin has an Adelskalender score of 151.571 points. His highest ranking on the Adelskalender was a fourth place.

References
 Vadim Sayutin at SkateResults.com
 Vadim Sayutin. Deutsche Eisschnelllauf Gemeinschaft e.V. (German Skating Association).
 Personal records from Jakub Majerski's Speedskating Database
 Evert Stenlund's Adelskalender pages
 Results of Championships of Russia and the USSR from SpeedSkating.ru
 Historical World Records. International Skating Union.

1970 births
Living people
Soviet male speed skaters
Kazakhstani male speed skaters
Russian male speed skaters
Olympic speed skaters of the Unified Team
Olympic speed skaters of Kazakhstan
Olympic speed skaters of Russia
Speed skaters at the 1992 Winter Olympics
Speed skaters at the 1994 Winter Olympics
Speed skaters at the 1998 Winter Olympics
Speed skaters at the 2002 Winter Olympics
World Allround Speed Skating Championships medalists